Horace Joseph Gaul (December 21, 1883 – July 9, 1939) was a Canadian professional ice hockey and lacrosse player who played from 1904 until 1913 most notably with the Pittsburgh Professionals, Haileybury Comets, Ottawa Senators and Toronto Tecumsehs. As a lacrosse player he was a member of the Ottawa Capital Lacrosse Club.

Playing career
Born in Gaspé, Quebec, Canada, the Gaul family moved to Ottawa, Ontario. Horace first played senior amateur hockey for the Ottawa Silver Seven in 1904–05, a member of the Stanley Cup winning squad. In 1906, he became professional, joining Pittsburgh of the International Hockey League. In 1907, he returned to Canada, playing for Brockville and Renfrew senior teams.

In 1908–09, Gaul split his time with Duquesne Athletic Club (of Pittsburgh) and Haileybury. He stayed with Haileybury for the inaugural National Hockey Association (NHA) 1910 season. When the team folded the next year, he returned to play for Ottawa and won a second Stanley Cup in 1911. In 1911, he joined New Glasgow of the Maritime Professional Hockey League (MPHL). He played his final season in 1912–13 for the new Toronto Tecumsehs of the NHA.

References

Notes

1883 births
1939 deaths
Duquesne Athletic Club players
Haileybury Comets players
Ice hockey people from Quebec
Ottawa Senators (NHA) players
Ottawa Senators (original) players
Pittsburgh Professionals players
People from Gaspé, Quebec
Stanley Cup champions
Toronto Tecumsehs players
Canadian ice hockey right wingers